Emilio Eduardo de Gogorza (May 29, 1872May 10, 1949) was an American baritone of Spanish parentage.

Biography
He was born in Brooklyn, New York, but brought up and trained musically in Spain. He returned to the USA in his early 20s. He sang in many languages, including French, Italian and English, as well as Spanish. Owing to pronounced near-sightedness, he did not appear on the operatic stage but became a renowned concert and recital artist instead.

De Gogorza recorded prodigiously for the Victor Talking Machine Company. His records display the intelligence and sensitivity of his singing, as well as a polished vocal technique.
Victor released many recordings not only under his own name but under various aliases such as Carlos Francisco and Herbert Goddard. He used these pseudonyms for records issued on Victor's lower priced black label instead of the premium priced Red Seal label for which he usually recorded.  In addition to recording, he also served as an early A&R man for Victor. He helped persuade other well-known opera singers to record for the company, including Enrico Caruso who signed with the label in 1904. Curiously, De Gogorza and Caruso made only one published recording together, a Spanish song entitled "A la luz de la luna" (In the moonlight) in 1918. In 1928, De Gogorza recorded the song again, with tenor Tito Schipa.

During this time he also was a professor of voice and music for the Curtis Institute of Music in Philadelphia. Among his students was Wilbur Evans who in December 1927 won the first Atwater Kent National Radio Audition, winning first prize out of 50,000 contestants. Evans would become a well-known baritone on Broadway and radio, as well as co-starring in London's South Pacific opposite Mary Martin.

De Gogorza also taught in retirement; among his pupils were the American composer Samuel Barber and the noted Philadelphia music critic, Max de Schauensee, who left many affectionate reminiscences of him.

He died in 1949 in New York City, from lung cancer at the age of 74.

Marriages
De Gogorza was first married on 29 October 1896 in Manhattan, New York, New York, to Elsa "Elsie" Neumoegen; (daughter of N. Berthold and Rebecca [Livingstone] Neumoegen). On his marriage certificate; Emilio listed his parents as Julis Antonio De Gogorza and Francisca Navarette. His occupation was listed as a "Singer" in the 1900 Census.

In 1911, De Gorgoza  married Emma Eames, the American soprano with whom he toured and also recorded duets for Victor. They were divorced in 1936.

Discography
List of 78RPM recordings available at the Diaz Ayala Collection at Florida International University (FIU) 
 A la luna (1918) - Victrola 64847
 A la luz de la luna (1928) - Victor 3049
 Absent - Victrola 64628
 All the World Will be Jealous of Me - Victrola 64688
 Beauty's Eyes - Victor 64372
 Benvenuto Cellini De l'Art, Splendeur Inmortelle (1909) - Victor 141
 Blue Bells of Scotland (1908) - Victrola 590
 Caballero de Gracia - Victor 4293
 Carlos Francisco - Victor B-417
 Carmen Chanson du Toréador (1906) - Victrola 88178

References

External links
 Emilio de Gogorza recordings at the Discography of American Historical Recordings.

1872 births
1949 deaths
Musicians from Brooklyn
American operatic baritones
American music educators
American people of Spanish descent
American expatriates in Spain
Educators from New York City
Classical musicians from New York (state)